Kosava, Košava or Koshava may refer to:

Places 
 Kosava, Belarus, a town
 Kosava castle, in Kosava, Belarus
 , also transliterated as Košava, a village in Vidin Municipality in Bulgaria
 Koshava Island, Antarctica, named after Koshava, Bulgaria

Other uses 
 Košava (wind), a wind in Serbia and nearby countries
 , a 1974 Yugoslav film
 Radio Košava, a radio station in Serbia, and a label of Viktorija
 TV Košava, a Serbian television station

See also 
 Kosova (disambiguation)